is a railway station in Nakano, Tokyo, Japan.

History
Saginomiya Station opened on 16 April 1927. Station numbering was introduced on all Seibu Railway lines during fiscal 2012, with Saginomiya Station becoming "SS09".

Passenger statistics
In fiscal 2016, the station was the 31st busiest on the Seibu network with an average of 31,671 passengers daily.

The passenger figures for previous years are as shown below.

References

External links

Saginomiya station information 

Railway stations in Tokyo
Nakano, Tokyo
Railway stations in Japan opened in 1927